The 1954 Cincinnati Bearcats football team represented the University of Cincinnati as an independent during the 1954 college football season. In their sixth and final season under head coach Sid Gillman, the Bearcats compiled an 8–2 record and outscored opponents by a total of 249 to 107.

The 1953 team ended its season on a winning streak, and the 1954 team extended the streak to 16 games.

Joe Miller led the team with 717 rushing yards (an average of 7.54 yards per carry) and 66 points scored on 11 rushing touchdowns. The team's other statistical leaders included Mike Murphy with 764 passing yards and Ferd Maccioli with 179 receiving yards.

In January 1955, the team's head coach, Sid Gillman, resigned to become the head coach of the Los Angeles Rams in the National Football League. In six years at Cincinnati, Gillman compiled a 50–13–1 record.

Schedule

References

Cincinnati
Cincinnati Bearcats football seasons
Cincinnati Bearcats football